Duration may refer to:

 The amount of time elapsed between two events
 Duration (music) – an amount of time or a particular time interval, often cited as one of the fundamental aspects of music
 Duration (philosophy) – a theory of time and consciousness first proposed by Henri Bergson
 Duration (project management) – the number of calendar periods for the completion of a project in project management
 Bond duration – the weighted average time until the various cash flows from a bond are received

See also
 Period (disambiguation)
For duration in economics and finance, see Bond duration and Autoregressive Conditional Duration.
For duration in phonetics and phonology (the feature of being pronounced longer) see Length (phonetics)